A referendum on a new constitution was held in Lithuania on 25 October 1992, alongside the first round of parliamentary elections. It was approved by 78.2% of those voting and 56.8% of all registered voters, passing the 50% threshold.

Results

References

1992 referendums
1992 in Lithuania
1992
Constitutional referendums